These quarterbacks have started at least one game played for the New York Jets of the National Football League. They are listed in order of the date of each player's first start.

Regular season

Postseason

Most games as starting quarterback
These quarterbacks have the most starts for the Jets in regular season games.

Team career passing records

See also
 Lists of NFL starting quarterbacks

References
 New York Jets Franchise Encyclopedia

New York Jets

quarterbacks